This is a list of the regions of the Baltic countries Estonia, Latvia and Lithuania by Human Development Index as of 2021.

See also 

 List of countries by Human Development Index

 List of regions of Baltic States by gross regional product (GRP)

References 

Baltic Countries
Baltic